Bashaara Keyana Graves (born March 17, 1994) is an American professional basketball player who plays for Olympiacos in Greece. She was drafted in 2016 by the Minnesota Lynx and she has played for the Chicago Sky of the Women's National Basketball Association (WNBA).

WNBA career statistics

Regular season

|-
| align="left" | 2016
| align="left" | Minnesota
| 12 || 0 || 3.4 || .286 || .000 || .000 || 0.3 || 0.2 || 0.0 || 0.0 || 0.3 || 0.3
|-
| align="left" | 2017
| align="left" | Chicago
| 10 || 0 || 9.2 || .500 || .000 || .571 || 2.3 || 0.5 || 0.2 || 0.1 || 0.6 || 2.6
|-
| align="left" | Career
| align="left" | 2 years, 2 teams
| 22 || 0 || 6.0 || .448 || .000 || .571 || 1.2 || 0.3 || 0.1 || 0.0 || 0.4 || 1.4

Tennessee statistics
Source

References

External links
Tennessee Lady Vols bio

1994 births
Living people
American women's basketball players
Basketball players from Tennessee
Chicago Sky players
Forwards (basketball)
McDonald's High School All-Americans
Minnesota Lynx draft picks
Minnesota Lynx players
Olympiacos Women's Basketball players
Parade High School All-Americans (girls' basketball)
People from Clarksville, Tennessee
Tennessee Lady Volunteers basketball
21st-century American women